Alsophila eriophora, synonym Cyathea eriophora, is a species of tree fern native to eastern New Guinea, where it grows in wet ravine forest at an altitude of 1400–2000 m. The trunk is erect and 2–3 m tall. Fronds are bi- or tripinnate and 2–3 m long. The stipe is dark and covered with spines and scales. The scales are variable, being either small and pale or large with a dark apex. Sori occur near the fertile pinnule midvein and lack indusia.

References

eriophora
Endemic flora of New Guinea